Mirano Carrilho (born July 19, 1975 in Amsterdam, Netherlands) is a retired football player, who moved from FC Dordrecht to MK Dons in 2005 on a short-term deal after a trial period.

Club career
Before joining MK Dons on a half-year contract in summer 2005, the full-back/winger made 187 appearances and scored 3 goals for previous clubs which include FC Dordrecht, De Graafschap and ADO Den Haag.

In January 2006 he returned to Holland to play for AGOVV, where he suddenly retired in March 2008 after it became clear his 1-year old daughter had fallen seriously ill.

References

1975 births
Living people
Footballers from Amsterdam
Dutch sportspeople of Surinamese descent
Association football fullbacks
Dutch footballers
HFC Haarlem players
Rot-Weiss Essen players
ADO Den Haag players
De Graafschap players
FC Dordrecht players
Milton Keynes Dons F.C. players
AGOVV Apeldoorn players
Dutch expatriate footballers
Expatriate footballers in Germany
Expatriate footballers in England
Dutch expatriate sportspeople in Germany
Dutch expatriate sportspeople in England